Medved (Russian: медведь) means bear in several Slavic languages, including Slovenian, Russian, Czech, Serbian and Slovak. It may refer to:

 Medved (surname)
 Medved (rural locality), several rural localities in Novgorod Oblast, Russia
 Medved (hunting rifle), a Soviet hunting rifle
 Medved, an iconic bear in the Internet meme Preved

See also
 

Slavic words and phrases